The 1994 World Women's Curling Championship was held at the Eisstadion in Oberstdorf, Germany from April 10–17, 1994.

Teams

Round-robin standings

Round-robin results

Draw 1

Draw 2

Draw 3

Draw 4

Draw 5

Draw 6

Draw 7

Draw 8

Draw 9

Tiebreaker

Playoffs

Brackets

Final

References
 

World Women's Curling Championship
Curling
World Women's Curling Championship, 1994
International curling competitions hosted by Germany 
Women's curling competitions in Germany
International sports competitions hosted by Germany
April 1994 sports events in Europe
1994 in Bavaria
Sports competitions in Oberstdorf